Knockinaam Lodge is a hotel and restaurant located about 3.5 miles South of Portpatrick, Dumfries & Galloway, Scotland. , the restaurant holds one star in the Michelin Guide. As of 2015 it has retained its Michelin Star. By 2017, the Lodge restaurant no longer holds a Michelin star.

It was built in 1869 as a hunting lodge for the Hunter-Blair family from Blairquhan, Maybole, Ayrshire.  Winston Churchill and General Dwight Eisenhower are said to have planned the D-Day landings here.

References 

Restaurants in Scotland
Michelin Guide starred restaurants in the United Kingdom
Tourist attractions in Dumfries and Galloway
Hunting lodges in Scotland